Hemifusus is a genus of sea snails, marine gastropod molluscs in the family Melongenidae, the crown conches and their allies.

Description 
The type description of genus Hemifusus by English malacologist William John Swainson reads as follows:

Species
Species within the genus Hemifusus include:
 Hemifusus alfi Thach, 2021
 Hemifusus boucheti Thach, 2017
 † Hemifusus charlieleei Harzhauser, Raven & Landau, 2018 
 Hemifusus colosseus (Lamarck, 1816)
 Hemifusus crassacauda (Philippi, 1849)
 Hemifusus hitoshiikedai Thach, 2020
 Hemifusus kawamurai Kira, 1965
 Hemifusus schuetti Alf & Thach, 2021
 Hemifusus treudei Alf & Thach, 2021
 Hemifusus tuba (Gmelin, 1791)
 Hemifusus yurikantori Thach, 2017
Species brought into synonymy 
 Hemifusus crassicaudus (Philippi, 1849) : synonym of Hemifusus crassacauda (Philippi, 1849)
 Hemifusus elongatus (Lamarck, 1822): synonym of Pugilina elongata (Lamarck, 1822): synonym of Lenifusus elongatus (Lamarck, 1822)
 Hemifusus ternatanus (Gmelin, 1791): synonym of Brunneifusus ternatanus (Gmelin, 1791)
 † Hemifusus washingtonianus Weaver, 1912: synonym of † Whitneyella washingtoniana (Weaver, 1912) (original combination)
 Hemifusus zhangyii Kosuge, 2008: synonym of Pyrula elongata Lamarck, 1822: synonym of Lenifusus elongatus (Lamarck, 1822)

References
This article incorporates public domain text from the reference.
 Vaught, K.C. (1989). A classification of the living Mollusca. American Malacologists: Melbourne, FL (USA). . XII, 195 pp

 Dekkers A. (2018). Two new genera in the family Melongenidae from the Indo-Pacific and comments on the identity of Hemifusus zhangyii Kosuge, 2008 and Pyrula elongata Lamarck, 1822 (Gastropoda, Neogastropoda: Buccinoidea). Gloria Maris. 57(2): 40-50

External links
 Swainson, W. (1840). A treatise on malacology or shells and shell-fish. London, Longman. viii + 419 pp

Melongenidae